The 1979 Alberta general election was held on March 14, 1979, to elect members of the Legislative Assembly of Alberta, which had been expanded to 79 seats.

The Progressive Conservative Party of Peter Lougheed won its third consecutive term in government. During the campaign, some Progressive Conservatives spoke of winning "79 in '79", i.e., all 79 seats in the legislature.  This harkened back to Social Credit's unofficial slogan from the 1963 election, "63 in '63".  The Tories came up short of this goal, and actually lost over five percentage points of the popular vote.  Nonetheless, they still won an overwhelming majority, with 74 seats.

Social Credit held on to the four seats they had won in the 1975 election, and formed the official opposition in the legislature.  Grant Notley, leader of the Alberta New Democratic Party, was the only other opposition member.

Results

Notes:
1 Percent compared to Independent Progressive Conservative during the 1975 Election. 
* Party did not nominate candidates in the previous election.

Results by riding

|-
|Athabasca|||
|Frank Appleby4,15355.39%
|
|Ernest W. Maser98913.19%
|
|Peter E. Opryshko1,79223.90%
|
|Robert Blain Logan5547.39%
|
||||
|Frank Appleby
|-
|Banff-Cochrane|||
|Greg Stevens5,57866.79%
|
|Thomas McArthur1,46217.51%
|
|Bob Ritchie7599.09%
|
|Morna F. Schechtel5436.50%
|
||||
|
|-
|Barrhead|||
|Hugh F. Horner4,62961.73%
|
|David Bouyea1,65822.11%
|
|Lionel Udenberg1,00813.44%
|
|John V. Murphy1361.81%
|
||||
|Hugh F. Horner
|-
|Bonnyville|||
|Ernie Isley3,46849.57%
|
|George Nordstrom1,27518.22%
|
|Tom Turner1,82826.13%
|
|Edward Stepanik1942.77%
|
|Donald Appleby (Ind.)2062.94%|||
|Donald Hansen
|-
|Bow Valley
|
|Paul Bartlett2,48435.92%|||
|Fred T. Mandeville4,12359.62%
|
|Ron Wickson2012.91%
|
|Brian Nearing861.24%
|
||||
|Fred T. Mandeville
|-
|Calgary-Bow|||
|Neil Webber7,04264.39%
|
|Jim Beale1,81616.61%
|
|Floyd A. Johnson1,36112.45%
|
|Clive Scott6335.79%
|
|Adela Polancec (Comm.)470.43%|||
|Neil Webber
|-
|Calgary-Buffalo|||
|Tom Sindlinger6,48163.78%
|
|Jim Rocker1,43214.09%
|
|Brian Rees1,05210.35%
|
|Lloyd Hamilton1,09610.79%
|
|David Willis (Comm.)620.61%|||
|Ronald H. Ghitter
|-
|Calgary-Currie|||
|Dennis L. Anderson6,88559.57%
|
|Charles S. Dunkley2,82224.42%
|
|Glenn Miller1,0429.02%
|
|Jerry Arshinoff7896.83%
|
||||
|Fred H. Peacock
|-
|Calgary-Egmont|||
|Merv Leitch8,08373.30%
|
|Albert Downton1,24511.29%
|
|Muriel McCreary8447.65%
|
|Marta Coldham8337.55%
|
||||
|Merv Leitch
|-
|Calgary-Elbow|||
|David J. Russell5,94165.67%
|
|Patricia (Pat) Sveen1,32114.60%
|
|William J. Oxendale5315.87%
|
|John S. Webb1,22713.56%
|
||||
|David J. Russell
|-
|Calgary-Fish Creek|||
|William Edward Payne9,18775.94%
|
|Al Green1,1909.84%
|
|Margaret Young4813.98%
|
|Jerry Sykes1,22510.13%
|
||||
|
|-
|Calgary-Foothills|||
|Stewart A. McCrae7,51861.89%
|
|Lorraine Law2,83523.34%
|
|Steve G. Arnett9828.08%
|
|Catherine M. Fitzpatrick7896.50%
|
||||
|Stewart A. McCrae
|-
|Calgary-Forest Lawn|||
|John Zaozirny5,90159.39%
|
|Don Howes2,26322.78%
|
|Doug Murdoch8138.18%
|
|Marg Bogstie2842.86%
|
|John Sutherland (Ind.)5775.81%Bruce Potter (Comm.)470.47%|||
|
|-
|Calgary-Glenmore|||
|Hugh L. Planche8,21255.74%
|
|Ernie Kaszas1,2808.69%
|
|Neil Ellison4423.00%
|
|Nicholas Taylor4,77432.40%
|
||||
|Hugh L. Planche
|-
|Calgary-McCall|||
|Andrew Little7,91870.39%
|
|Jim Richards1,75715.62%
|
|Dave Hammond8387.45%
|
|Ron Chahal6916.14%
|
|Michael J. Parker (Comm.)200.18%|||
|Andrew Little
|-
|Calgary-McKnight|||
|Eric Charles Musgreave7,24861.61%
|
|Jerry Melchin2,68422.82%
|
|Jack Dale1,0979.33%
|
|John J. Gleason6645.64%
|
||||
|Eric Charles Musgreave
|-
|Calgary-Millican|||
|David John Carter4,03461.80%
|
|Arthur J. Dixon1,53923.58%
|
|Stan Johns5959.11%
|
|Bob Cox3315.07%
|
||||
|Thomas Charles Donnelly
|-
|Calgary-Mountain View|||
|Stan Kushner5,14154.54%
|
|Scott Saville1,98621.07%
|
|Martin Serediak1,45515.44%
|
|John Donnachie8048.53%
|
||||
|John Kushner
|-
|Calgary-North Hill|||
|Ed Oman6,76064.41%
|
|Dennis Shupe1,79917.14%
|
|Agnes Middleton1,05210.02%
|
|Dorothy Groves7477.12%
|
|John J. Jasienczyk (Ind.)710.68%|||
|Roy Alexander Farran
|-
|Calgary-North West|||
|Sheila Embury5,97661.59%
|
|Harold Gunderson2,04321.06%
|
|Ken Richmond7217.43%
|
|George R.D. Goulet9509.79%
|
||||
|
|-
|Calgary-West|||
|Peter Lougheed7,82572.44%
|
|Frank F. Cottingham9308.61%
|
|Ed Smith6996.47%
|
|Barbara Ann Scott8748.09%
|
|Jacob H. Binnema (Ind. Christian)4063.78%
||
|Peter Lougheed
|-
|Camrose|||
|Gordon Stromberg7,99860.06%
|
|Ralph A. Sorenson3,12123.44%
|
|Arthur C. Bunney1,88814.18%
|
|John R. Shores2782.09%
|
||||
|Gordon Stromberg
|-
|Cardston|||
|John Thompson2,83253.89%
|
|Broyce G. Jacobs2,19641.79%
|
|Rosemarie M. Buchannan1021.94%
|
|Paul Shaw1152.19%
|
||||
|John Thompson
|-
|Chinook|||
|Henry Kroeger4,02466.11%
|
|Arlie Reil1,31021.52%
|
|John W. Oberg4066.67%
|
|Sheila Noonan3145.16%
|
||||
|
|-
|Clover Bar
|
|C.G. Thomlinson3,94734.90%|||
|Walt A. Buck6,03353.35%
|
|Graham Griffiths1,1029.75%
|
|Alan M.F. Dunn2111.87%
|
||||
|Walt A. Buck
|-
|Cypress|||
|Alan Hyland3,35356.90%
|
|Vern Beck1,90732.36%
|
|Clarence W. Smith4998.47%
|
|Carl Pattison1232.09%
|
||||
|Alan Hyland
|-
|Drayton Valley|||
|Shirley Cripps3,53056.75%
|
|Phil Turner1,28420.64%
|
|Gerry Hutchinson1,29020.74%
|
|Harold Knopke941.51%
|
||||
|Rudolph Zander
|-
|Drumheller|||
|Lewis (Mickey) Clark5,58554.56%
|
|Ken Taylor1,91318.69%
|
|Ray Garrett5265.14%
|
|Charles J. Dirk2092.04%
|
|Vern Hoff (Ind.)1,92718.83%|||
|Gordon Edward Taylor
|-
|Edmonton-Avonmore|||
|Horst A. Schmid5,38253.91%
|
|Walter Zucht1,69116.94%
|
|Olga Blondheim2,36323.67%
|
|Betty Ann Dumbeck5115.12%
|
||||
|Horst A. Schmid
|-
|Edmonton-Belmont|||
|William L. Mack4,92354.90%
|
|Ron Mix1,81320.22%
|
|Haddie Jahner1,76919.73%
|
|Charalee Graydon3694.12%
|
||||
|Albert Edward Hohol
|-
|Edmonton-Beverly|||
|Bill W. Diachuk3,75650.29%
|
|Pat G.A. O'Hara85411.44%
|
|Gene Mitchell2,59234.71%
|
|Teresa McKerral2313.09%
|
||||
|Bill W. Diachuk
|-
|Edmonton-Calder|||
|Tom Chambers5,20558.18%
|
|Dan R. Service98210.98%
|
|Bill Kobluk2,18024.37%
|
|Richard Guthrie5355.98%
|
||||
|Tom Chambers
|-
|Edmonton-Centre|||
|Mary LeMessurier4,55054.19%
|
|Robert J. Dunseith8389.98%
|
|Harry C. Midgley2,27327.07%
|
|Leonard Stahl7048.38%
|
||||
|Gordon Miniely
|-
|Edmonton-Glengarry|||
|Rollie Cook4,30954.95%
|
|Victor Nakonechny1,27716.29%
|
|David Stewart1,48918.99%
|
|Ronald John Hayter7199.17%
|
||||
|
|-
|Edmonton-Glenora|||
|Lou Hyndman6,59761.23%
|
|Patrice Taylor1,33012.34%
|
|Doug Trace1,83817.06%
|
|David Panar9678.97%
|
||||
|Lou Hyndman
|-
|Edmonton-Gold Bar|||
|Alois Paul Hiebert6,04455.93%
|
|Ace Cetinski1,39712.93%
|
|Kathleen Wright2,34321.68%
|
|Laurie Switzer1,0029.27%
|
||||
|William Yurko
|-
|Edmonton-Highlands|||
|David T. King4,64456.28%
|
|Sam Motrich7709.33%
|
|Clifford Gladue2,06525.03%
|
|Ted Power5947.20%
|
|William A. Tuomi (Comm.)841.02%Roger Lavoie (Ind.)650.79%|||
|David T. King
|-
|Edmonton-Jasper Place|||
|Leslie Gordon Young5,04960.16%
|
|Ralph Frank Watzke1,03712.36%
|
|Charlie Wood1,73520.67%
|
|Gerald F. Paschen5546.60%
|
||||
|Leslie Gordon Young
|-
|Edmonton-Kingsway|||
|Kenneth R.H. Paproski4,38750.44%
|
|Martin Hattersly97511.21%
|
|Alex McEachern2,56329.47%
|
|Dorothy A. Richardson6847.86%
|
|Eddie Keehn (Ind.)510.59%|||
|Kenneth R.H. Paproski
|-
|Edmonton-Meadowlark|||
|Gerard Joseph Amerongen7,07559.97%
|
|Russ Forsythe1,23710.48%
|
|Jim Bell2,09817.78%
|
|Ron Charko9047.66%
|
|C.A. Douglas Ringrose (Ind.)4483.80%|||
|Gerard Joseph Amerongen
|-
|Edmonton-Mill Woods|||
|Milt Pahl4,29956.16%
|
|Rudy Rodriques5737.49%
|
|L. (Les) Owre1,55220.27%
|
|Rose MacPherson98912.92%
|
||||
|
|-
|Edmonton-Norwood|||
|Catherine Chichak3,95046.61%
|
|Mike Ekelund7038.29%
|
|Ray Martin3,19437.69%
|
|Walter G. Coombs4865.73%
|
|Kimball Cariou (Comm.)450.53%|||
|Catherine Chichak
|-
|Edmonton-Parkallen|||
|Neil S. Crawford6,45750.47%
|
|Morley MacCalder1,48311.59%
|
|Jim Russell4,10232.06%
|
|Philip Lister7245.66%
|
||||
|Neil S. Crawford
|-
|Edmonton-Sherwood Park|||
|Henry Woo6,28560.57%
|
|Oran Johnson1,59415.36%
|
|Jim Denholm1,68216.21%
|
|Stephen Lindop7957.66%
|
||||
|
|-
|Edmonton-Strathcona|||
|Julian Koziak5,46444.94%
|
|E.J.C. Charman9277.62%
|
|Gordon S.B. Wright4,80839.54%
|
|George Walton7396.08%
|
|Gerry Ball (Ind. P.C.)1551.28%Joseph Hill (Comm.)520.43%|||
|Julian Koziak
|-
|Edmonton-Whitemud|||
|Peter Knaak6,83357.54%
|
|Larry Heth9397.91%
|
|Ted Paszek2,12217.87%
|
|Don Milliken1,96416.54%
|
||||
|Donald Ross Getty
|-
|Edson|||
|Ian Reid4,51753.62%
|
|W.L. Land6768.02%
|
|Ron Hodgins2,95835.11%
|
|Herbert Maris2603.09%
|
||||
|Robert W. Dowling
|-
|Grande Prairie|||
|Elmer Borstad6,31350.12%
|
|Donald Wood3,38026.84%
|
|Campbell Ross2,26617.99%
|
|Helen Rice6014.77%
|
||||
|Winston Backus
|-
|Highwood|||
|George Wolstenholme5,10366.35%
|
|Don Dixon2,09227.20%
|
|William C. McCutcheon2813.65%
|
|Joan Cowling1912.48%
|
||||
|George Wolstenholme
|-
|Innisfail|||
|Nigel I. Pengelly4,26355.38%
|
|Stuart Little2,92137.94%
|
|Tim Guilbault3714.82%
|
|Janet Gratton1011.31%
|
||||
|Clifford L. Doan
|-
|Lac La Biche-McMurray|||
|Norman A. Weiss3,43149.68%
|
|Conrad Sehn1,34719.50%
|
|Claire E. Williscroft1,77725.73%
|
|Denise Diesel3204.63%
|
||||
|Ron Tesolin
|-
|Lacombe|||
|John William Cookson4,45864.11%
|
|Elmer Suominen1,40920.26%
|
|Arthur Wigmore71710.31%
|
|Roger C. Holteen2603.74%
|
|Gordon Crofton (Ind.)851.22%|||
|John William Cookson
|-
|Lesser Slave Lake|||
|Larry R. Shaben2,31345.82%
|
|Peter Moore1,74334.53%
|
|Mike Poulter79915.83%
|
|Dan Backs1713.39%
|
||||
|Larry R. Shaben
|-
|Lethbridge-East|||
|Archibald Dick Johnston5,87059.35%
|
|Roxie McCallum1,22312.37%
|
|Roger Rickwood6927.00%
|
|Frank Merkl6666.73%
|
|Ken Kotkas (Ind. Con.)1,37513.99%
||
|Archibald Dick Johnston
|-
|Lethbridge-West|||
|John Gogo5,68264.60%
|
|Jerry Waldern1,62518.47%
|
|Ron Clark97111.04%
|
|Bob Wilson5115.81%
|
||||
|John Gogo
|-
|Little Bow
|
|Richard Papworth1,68429.37%|||
|Raymond Albert Speaker3,74865.38%
|
|Beth Jantzie2364.12%
|
|John W. Fujimargari430.75%
|
||||
|Raymond Albert Speaker
|-
|Lloydminster|||
|James Edgar Miller4,67478.49%
|
|Patrick A. Moore4457.47%
|
|Elinar A. Jonson68011.42%
|
|Gregory R. Berry1312.20%
|
||||
|James Edgar Miller
|-
|Macleod|||
|LeRoy Fjordbotten4,18958.79%
|
|Roelof A. Heinen2,36933.25%
|
|Kathleen M. Cairns3845.39%
|
|Alfred Saddleback1712.40%
|
||||
|Thomas James John Walker
|-
|Medicine Hat|||
|James Horsman10,10772.59%
|
|Lee Anderson1,90413.67%
|
|Frances Ost1,1348.14%
|
|Louise Mercier7295.24%
|
||||
|
|-
|Olds-Didsbury
|
|Bill Edgar2,51427.50%|||
|Robert Curtis Clark6,39970.00%
|
|Gregory Hoffarth1521.66%
|
|Stephen Shaw550.60%
|
||||
|Robert Curtis Clark
|-
|Peace River|||
|Al (Boomer) Adair3,90159.77%
|
|Garry Gaudet78412.01%
|
|Richard Collins1,60424.57%
|
|Donald W. Freeland2343.59%
|
||||
|Al (Boomer) Adair
|-
|Pincher Creek-Crowsnest|||
|Frederick Deryl Bradley3,56760.43%
|
|Robert (Bob) Westrop1,50325.46%
|
|Ian Downie62810.64%
|
|Ann Gill1813.07%
|
||||
|Frederick Deryl Bradley
|-
|Ponoka|||
|Donald J. McCrimmon3,31750.17%
|
|Roy Kinley1,85628.07%
|
|Bruce A. Beck1,27919.34%
|
|Gus Itzek1131.71%
|
||||
|Donald J. McCrimmon
|-
|Red Deer|||
|Norman F. Magee5,72743.14%
|
|Bob Mills5,40640.72%
|
|Ken McMillan1,86114.02%
|
|Hubert Bouten2581.94%
|
||||
|James L. Foster
|-
|Redwater-Andrew|||
|George Topolnisky3,94552.31%
|
|Erwin Hannig5477.25%
|
|Steve Leskiw2,87038.05%
|
|Rudolph Pisesky1481.96%
|
||||
|George Topolnisky
|-
|Rocky Mountain House|||
|John Murray Campbell4,08052.99%
|
|Lavern J. Ahlstrom2,62834.13%
|
|John Younie87111.31%
|
|Roger Hamilton1041.35%
|
||||
|Helen Hunley
|-
|Smoky River|||
|Marvin Moore3,03251.85%
|
|Bernard Lamoureux85414.60%
|
|Anne Hemmingway1,74329.81%
|
|Stephen V. Marchand2143.66%
|
||||
|Marvin Moore
|-
|Spirit River-Fairview
|
|Jim Reynolds2,66839.43%
|
|Aubrey Milner3565.26%|||
|Grant W. Notley3,65754.05%
|
|Terry Fletcher681.01%
|
||||
|Grant W. Notley
|-
|St. Albert|||
|Myrna Fyfe9,36158.68%
|
|Reginald C. Petch1,68610.57%
|
|Robert (Bob) Borreson3,17819.92%
|
|Gerry Thibault1,68110.54%
|
||||
|William Ernest Jamison
|-
|St. Paul|||
|Charles E. Anderson3,17346.26%
|
|John Hull5828.49%
|
|Laurent (Jeff) Dubois2,85441.61%
|
|Orest Boyko2193.19%
|
||||
|Mick Fluker
|-
|Stettler|||
|Graham L. Harle4,26269.94%
|
|David Thomas1,19119.54%
|
|Fred J. Rappel5038.25%
|
|Douglas Cramer1101.81%
|
||||
|Graham L. Harle
|-
|Stony Plain|||
|William Frederick Purdy6,92758.94%
|
|Oscar Venoasen2,27419.35%
|
|Sara Johnson1,21810.36%
|
|Andy R. McKinnon1,25010.64%
|
|Eleanor T. Louden (Ind. Con.)830.71%
||
|William Frederick Purdy
|-
|Taber-Warner|||
|Robert Bogle5,01064.98%
|
|Paul Primeau2,10827.34%
|
|Larry Schowalter2142.78%
|
|Jessie Snow3354.35%
|
||||
|Robert Bogle
|-
|Three Hills|||
|Connie Osterman4,40159.32%
|
|Henry Goerzen2,66035.85%
|
|Hugh Sommerville2222.99%
|
|Ward Sykes1241.67%
|
||||
|Allan Warrack
|-
|Vegreville|||
|John S. Batiuk3,83548.99%
|
|Robert E. Robert1,21015.46%
|
|Harry Babchuk2,49031.81%
|
|Alan Arthur Vinet2693.44%
|
||||
|John S. Batiuk
|-
|Vermilion-Viking|||
|Tom Lysons3,29251.46%
|
|Doug Livingstone2,08732.62%
|
|Grant Bergman87713.71%
|
|Ralph A. Wilson1181.84%
|
||||
|Tom Lysons
|-
|Wainwright|||
|Charles Stewart3,48956.36%
|
|Keith Cornish2,10333.97%
|
|Alan Richards5098.22%
|
|Sultan Tejani771.24%
|
||||
|Charles Stewart
|-
|Wetaskiwin-Leduc|||
|Dallas Schmidt8,21658.69%
|
|Reinhold Ortlieb2,70219.30%
|
|Earl R. Rasmuson2,37216.94%
|
|Brian King6774.84%
|
||||
|Dallas Schmidt
|-
|Whitecourt|||
|Peter Trynchy3,83457.64%
|
|George L. Richardson1,21418.25%
|
|Ken Forscutt1,44221.68%
|
|
|
||||
|Peter Trynchy
|-
|}

See also
List of Alberta political parties

Further reading
 

1979 elections in Canada
1979
1979 in Alberta
March 1979 events in Canada